Jørn Johnson is a Norwegian Olympic boxer. He represented his country in the light-middleweight division at the 1996 Summer Olympics. He won his first bout against Sean Black, but lost his second against Mohamed Marmouri.

References

1971 births
Living people
Norwegian male boxers
Olympic boxers of Norway
Boxers at the 1996 Summer Olympics
Light-middleweight boxers
Sportspeople from Porsgrunn
20th-century Norwegian people